Óscar Fabbiani (born 17 December 1950 in Buenos Aires) is an Argentine-Chilean professional footballer who played international football for the Chile national team Fabbiani was three times topscorer in the Chilean league with Palestino and was the leading scorer in the North American Soccer League for the Tampa Bay Rowdies in 1979. Fabbiani comes from a family of footballers, he has 13 relatives who were professional footballers, including a nephew, Cristian Fabbiani.

Honours

Club
Palestino
 Primera División de Chile: 1978
 Copa Chile: 1975, 1977

Individual
 Primera División de Chile Top Scorer: 1976, 1977, 1978
 NASL Top Scorer: 1979

References

External links
Dallas Sidekicks profile
BDFA profile 
NASL/MISL stats
misc stats 

1950 births
Living people
Argentine emigrants to Chile
Argentine people of Italian descent
Footballers from Buenos Aires
Argentine footballers
Argentine expatriate footballers
Club Deportivo Palestino footballers
Estudiantes de Buenos Aires footballers
Chilean footballers
Chilean expatriate footballers
Chile international footballers
Chilean people of Italian descent
Everton de Viña del Mar footballers
Expatriate footballers in Chile
Argentine expatriate sportspeople in Chile
1979 Copa América players
Association football forwards
San Martín de Tucumán footballers
Coquimbo Unido footballers
Chilean Primera División players
Major Indoor Soccer League (1978–1992) players
North American Soccer League (1968–1984) indoor players
North American Soccer League (1968–1984) players
Tampa Bay Rowdies (1975–1993) players
Dallas Sidekicks (original MISL) players
Naturalized citizens of Chile
Chilean expatriate sportspeople in the United States
Argentine expatriate sportspeople in the United States
Expatriate soccer players in the United States
Chilean expatriate sportspeople in South Africa
Expatriate soccer players in South Africa